20 Mule Team Borax is a brand of cleaner manufactured in the United States by The Dial Corporation, a subsidiary of Henkel. The product primarily consists of borax, also known as sodium borate, sodium tetraborate, or disodium tetraborate, and is named after the 20-mule teams that were used by William Tell Coleman's company to move borax out of Death Valley, California, to the nearest rail spur between 1883 and 1889.

Ingredients
When borax is added to water, it converts some molecules in the water to hydrogen peroxide, and changes the pH level from a neutral 7 to a more basic 8. 

Borateem is 98.7 percent borax with tribromsalan, a microbiocide, and sodium dodecylbenzene sulfonate, an insecticide (but more importantly, a common laundry detergent).

Boraxo is a powdered hand soap.

History
20-mule teams were first used by Francis Marion Smith to move borax out of the desert. Smith subsequently acquired Coleman's holdings in 1890 and consolidated them with his own to form the Pacific Coast Borax Company. After the 20-mule teams were replaced by a new rail spur, the name 20 Mule Team Borax was established and aggressively promoted by Pacific Coast Borax to increase sales.

Stephen Mather, son of J. W. Mather, the administrator of the company's New York office, persuaded Smith to add the name 20 Mule Team Borax to accompany the sketch of the mule team already on the box. The 20-mule team symbol was first used in 1891 and registered in 1894. In 1988, just over 20 years after the acquisition of U.S. Borax by Rio Tinto Group, the Boraxo, Borateem and 20-Mule Team product lines were sold to Dial Corporation by U.S. Borax.

Dial is now an American consumer products unit of Henkel.

References

External links
Dial's product information page
Rio Tinto's 20 Mule Team Borax official site
20-mule Team Borax History - DesertUSA

Cleaning product brands
Death Valley
Dial Corporation brands
Products introduced in 1891
Borates